Chen Jianxin may refer to:

Chen Jianxin (athlete), Chinese Asian Games athlete
Chen Jianxin (curler), Chinese wheelchair curling parathlete
Chen Jianxin (cyclist), Chinese cyclist parathlete